Awakatek (also known as Aguateco, Awaketec, Coyotin, Chalchitec, and Balamiha, and natively as Qa'yol) is a Mayan language spoken in Guatemala, primarily in Huehuetenango and around Aguacatán. The language only has fewer than 10,000 speakers, and is considered vulnerable by UNESCO. In addition, the language in Mexico is at high risk of endangerment, with fewer than 2,000 speakers in the state of Campeche in 2010 (although the number of speakers was unknown  as of 2000).

Awakatek is closely related to Ixil and the two languages together form the sub-branch Ixilean, which together with the Mamean languages, Mam and Tektitek, form a sub-branch Greater-Mamean, which again, together with the Greater-Quichean languages, ten Mayan languages, including Kʼicheʼ, form the branch Quichean–Mamean.

Etymology

The Awakatek people themselves refer to their language as qaʼyol, literally meaning 'our word'. They also call themselves qatanum, which means 'our people' and is distinct from the word Awakatec, which is used in Spanish in reference to the municipality of Aguacatán (which means place of abundant avocados and refers to agricultural production and not specifically to the indigenous people).

Phonology

Vowels

Diphthongs
There are four diphthongs: ay , ey , oy , uy .

Consonants

The coronal ejectives may be allophonically pre-voiced.

References 

Agglutinative languages
Mayan languages
Indigenous languages of Central America
Mesoamerican languages
Languages of Guatemala
Huehuetenango Department